Dimont is a surname. Notable people with the surname include:

Max Dimont (1912–1992), Finnish American historian and author
Jacques Dimont (1945–1994), French fencer

Fictional characters
Dandie Dinmont, a character in Guy Mannering, a novel by Walter Scott, after which the Dandie Dimont Terrier breed was named

See also
Dimon
Diamont

French-language surnames